The title Earl of Kellie or Kelly is a title in the Peerage of Scotland, created in 1619 for Sir Thomas Erskine, who was Captain of the Guard and Groom of the Stool for James VI. It is named after Barony of Kellie in Fife, Scotland. Since 1875, it has been held jointly with the Earldom of Mar (1565 creation).

The family seat is Hilton Farm, near Alloa, Clackmannanshire.

History
The Earldom of Kellie was united with the Earldom of Mar in 1835, when the 26th Earl of Mar became also the 11th Earl of Kellie. At the death of that Earl in 1866, the Earldom of Kellie and the family's estates passed to Walter Erskine, the cousin of the late Earl, and his heir-male. Meanwhile, it was assumed that the Earldom of Mar passed to John Francis Goodeve, the late Earl's nephew, and his heir-general. Goodeve changed his name to Goodeve Erskine; his claim was agreed upon by most individuals. He even participated in the election of representative peers for the Peerage of Scotland.

However, the Earl of Kellie submitted a petition to the House of Lords asking that the Earldom of Mar be declared his, dying before it could be considered. His son, the 13th Earl of Kellie, renewed the petition, and the Lords decided the matter in 1875, determining that the Earldom of Mar properly belonged to the Earl of Kellie. However, due to a sentiment that the Lords had decided wrongly, the Earldom of Mar Restitution Act was passed. That Act declared that there were two Earldoms of Mar — one that would belong to the Earl of Kellie, and another that would belong to John Goodeve Erskine.

The subsidiary titles belonging to the Earl of Mar and Kellie are: Viscount of Fentoun or Fenton (created 1606), Lord Erskine (1429) and Lord Erskine of Dirleton (1603), the former of which is used as a courtesy title for the eldest son and heir of the Earl. Both titles are in the Peerage of Scotland.  The Earl is Hereditary Keeper of Stirling Castle.

The family seat was Kellie Castle, near Pittenweem, Fife.

Earls of Kellie (1619)

 Sir Thomas Erskine, 1st Earl of Kellie (1566–1639)
 Thomas Erskine, 2nd Earl of Kellie (died 1643)
 Alexander Erskine, 3rd Earl of Kellie (died 1677)
 Alexander Erskine, 4th Earl of Kellie (died 1710)
 Alexander Erskine, 5th Earl of Kellie (died 1756)
 Thomas Alexander Erskine, 6th Earl of Kellie (1732–1781)
 Archibald Erskine, 7th Earl of Kellie (1736–1795)
 Charles Erskine, 8th Earl of Kellie (1765–1799). In 1791 he succeeded to the Erskine of Cambo Baronetcy which merged with the Earldom until its extinction in 1829. 
 Thomas Erskine, 9th Earl of Kellie (–1828)
 Methven Erskine, 10th Earl of Kellie (c. 1750–1829)
John Francis Miller Erskine, 11th Earl of Kellie (1795–1866) (succeeded to Earldom of Kellie 1829, confirmed  9th/26th Earl of Mar 1835)
Walter Coningsby Erskine, 12th Earl of Kellie (1810–1872): (recognized posthumously as 10th Earl of Mar)
Walter Henry Erskine, 13th Earl of Kellie (1839–1888) (recognised 11th Earl of Mar 1875)
Walter John Francis Erskine, 12th Earl of Mar and 14th Earl of Kellie (1865–1955)
John Francis Hervey Erskine, 13th Earl of Mar and 15th Earl of Kellie (1921–1993)
James Thorne Erskine, 14th Earl of Mar and 16th Earl of Kellie (b. 1949)

The heir presumptive is the present holder's brother the Hon. Alexander David Erskine, Master of Mar and Kellie (b. 1952).
The heir presumptive's heir apparent is his only son Alexander Capel Erskine (b. 1979).

See also
Earl of Mar (seventh creation)
Erskine baronets
Clan Erskine
Kellie Lodge

References

External links

 The Great Historic Families of Scotland — The Erskines of Kellie (1887) by James Taylor

Earldoms in the Peerage of Scotland
Fife
Lists of Scottish people
Earl
Noble titles created in 1619